Richard Wöss (born 10 October 1986) is an Austrian handball player for TUSEM Essen and the Austrian national team.

References

External links

1986 births
Living people
Austrian male handball players
Handball players from Vienna
Expatriate handball players
Austrian expatriate sportspeople in Germany